Jyoti Nilayam Higher Secondary is a school located in St Andrews, Thiruvananthapuram, Kerala, India. The school is recognized by the government of Kerala and follows KER syllabus. The school was upgraded to the Higher Secondary Level during the academic year 2002–2003. The school started a separate Central Board of Secondary Education (CBSE) affiliated section in the same campus in 2010.

The school serves students from lower kindergarten to higher secondary level. It is open to all students irrespective of caste and creed.

Schools in Thiruvananthapuram district